The Ning'er Hani and Yi Autonomous County is an autonomous county under the jurisdiction of Pu'er City in the southwest of Yunnan Province, China.

Name

The county was formerly named Pu'er. When Simao changed its name back to Pu'er in 2007, the county's name was changed to Ning'er for clarity.

Administrative divisions
In the present, Ning'er Hani and Yi Autonomous County has 6 towns and 3 townships.
6 towns

3 townships
 De'an
 Puyi
 Liming 

Demography
The population of the county has a large proportion of native Hani and Yi people in a predominantly Han Chinese population. As of 2003 the county records a population of approximately 190,000 people.

Ethnic Bai (population: 5,139) are found in Kesa , Heping village , Mengxian township  (Pu'er County Gazetteer 1993:120).

The Datou  people number 254 persons and are found in Ning'er County and Simao City. They consider themselves to be ethnic Yi, and also speak a Yi language (You 2013:133).

Climate

Transport 
China National Highway 213

References

External links
Ning'er County Official Website

 
County-level divisions of Pu'er City
Hani autonomous counties
Yi autonomous counties